Hanakapiai Falls or Hanakapi'ai Falls is an approximately  high waterfall located in Hawaii, United States on the Na Pali side of the island of Kauai. It requires a hike of approximately 2 miles from Hanakapi'ai Beach. The waterfall is described as "gorgeous but challenging". The trail is a popular day-hike for able-bodied hikers.

References

Tourist attractions in Kauai County, Hawaii
Waterfalls of Kauai
Waterfalls of Hawaii